Lost City Raiders is a 2008 made-for-television science fiction film written and directed by Jean de Segonzac. It starred James Brolin, Ian Somerhalder, Jamie King, and Bettina Zimmermann.

Plot
In year 2048, global warming has caused much of the surface of the earth to become flooded. In the city of New Vatican, Cardinal Battaglia believes that the global inundation can be gotten rid of by using the "scepter of Moses". This is the staff that Moses used to part the Red Sea during The Exodus.

Cardinal Battaglia contacts John Kubiak (James Brolin) and his sons Jack (Ian Somerhalder) and Thomas (Jamie King). The Kubiak family is raiding the sunken cities for various treasures lost beneath the waves. The Kubiaks are to assist Brother Fontana and Father Giacopetti in a submarine to retrieve the scepter and save the earth. They are opposed by Nicholas Filiminov (Ben Cross), a major land dealer who wants the scepter for his own purposes; having forced the water to rise to cover the remaining land, survivors will be forced to live in his planned floating communities, and he can then purchase the sunken land for a pittance before lowering the water level again. He enlists the help of Giovanna Becker, Jack's ex, to help him find the scepter. Meanwhile, a waitress Cara joins the Kubiak team as the ship mechanic and helps Jack and Thomas, especially after their father is killed trying to fend off Filiminov's men.

Despite the attempted intervention of an insane Father Giacopetti who sees the Rising as God's punishment for mankind's sins, the new Team Kubiak are able to activate an ancient chamber that triggers a gas explosion and consequently lowering of the flood waters. The film ends with the team having dinner and contemplating their future as they visit the thirty-one other chambers listed on the map as activating that one chamber only caused the Mediterranean to drop ten meters while not affecting the rest of the world.

Cast
 James Brolin as John Kubiak
 Ian Somerhalder as Jack Kubiak
 Bettina Zimmermann as Giovanna Becker
 Jamie King as Thomas Kubiak
 Élodie Frenck as Cara
 Michael Mendl as Cardinal Battaglia
 Jeremy Crutchley as Father Giacopetti
 Ben Cross as Nicholas Filiminov

Production
German commercial television station ProSieben, the American cable television network Sci Fi Channel, Austrian production company Tandem Communications produced the film. Its budget was US$6 million.<ref>"What to Watch". Kansas City Star. November 16, 2008.</ref>

The film was first announced in March 2006. Tandem Communications intentionally picked an international cast, part of the company's successful strategy of making films easily marketable around the world. Within weeks of the announcement of the production, the film had already been pre-sold in Germany, France, and Spain.

Principal cinematography was to have begun in the summer of 2006, but did not begin until April 2008.

The 90-minute film was intended to air in two parts. The Sci Fi Channel hoped that it would lead to a series. The film had its worldwide television debut on 31 October 2008 in Germany. It debuted on the Sci Fi Channel on 22 November 2008.

Reception
David Hinckley in the New York Daily News found the production values exceptionally low and the film predictable. "Sadly, the action turns out to be fairly predictable. Not as predictable as Brolin's acting, but predictable nonetheless, which may be why the filmmakers insert a romantic subplot involving not one, but two spirited, adventuresome women." Linda Stasi of the New York Post called it bad and cheesy. The Tampa Tribune called it "Waterworld'' without the budget" and an "awful movie".

References

External links
 

2008 films
2008 television films
2000s English-language films
Austrian television films
German television films
English-language Austrian films
English-language German films
Climate change films
Films set in the future
Syfy original films
Films set in 2048
Austrian science fiction films
German science fiction films
2008 science fiction films
Films directed by Jean de Segonzac
2000s American films
2000s German films
ProSieben original programming